Dan Sonney (23 January 1915 – 3 March 2002) was a director, producer and distributor of exploitation films. He was the son of Louis Sonney, who founded Sonney Amusements, the husband of Margaret Sonney, and a long-term business partner of David F. Friedman.

In 2001 he co-starred in the documentary Mau Mau Sex Sex along with Friedman.

References

External links

1915 births
2002 deaths
American film directors
American film producers